Ptichodis immunis is a moth of the family Erebidae. It is found in Mexico (Chiapas, Oaxaca, Yucatán), Belize, Costa Rica, Ecuador, Suriname, French Guiana, Venezuela, Brazil (Amazonas, Mato Grosso), Barbados, Cuba, Martinique, Guadeloupe, St. Kitts, Antigua and Barbuda, Hispaniola, St. Vincent, Grenada, Puerto Rico, Jamaica, the Virgin Islands, as well as in the United States, where it has been recorded from Georgia, Florida and Texas.

Adults are on wing from March to April in Florida and Georgia and from October to November in Texas.

References

Moths described in 1852
Ptichodis